Qu Geping is a Chinese environmental scientist. He was Director of the Chinese State Environmental Protection Agency from	1987 to June 1993.

In 1999, he was the winner of the Blue Planet Prize along with Paul R. Ehrlich.

In 2001, he was awarded the Duke of Edinburgh Conservation Medal, the highest award of the World Wildlife Fund, calling him the father of environmental protection in China.

References

Living people
Environmental scientists
Chinese earth scientists
Year of birth missing (living people)